Eldorado Airport is a public use airport located  east of Eldorado, Misiones, Argentina.

See also
List of airports in Argentina

References

External links 
 Airport record for Eldorado Airport at Landings.com

Airports in Argentina
Misiones Province